Kentucky Jubilee is a 1951 American musical-comedy film directed by Ron Ormond for Lippert Pictures.

Plot
Reporter Ellison; self-important film director Feld; and brash Master Of Ceremonies Colonna arrive in rural Kentucky to cover a local music festival. City boys all; they are suffering from culture shock as they try to adjust to their surroundings. The trio end up inadvertently foiling a plot to steal the Festival's gate receipts. The film is also a showcase for a series of Ed Sullivan-like variety acts.

Cast
Jerry Colonna as Jerry Harris
Jean Porter as Sally Shannon
James Ellison as Jeff Benson
Fritz Feld as Rudolph Jouvet
Raymond Hatton as Ben White
Vince Barnett as Mugsy
Si Jenks as Constable
Margia Dean as Millie
Chester Clute as Mayor Horace Tilbury
Michael Whalen as Touhy
Archie Twitchell as Barney Malone

External links

Kentucky Jubilee at BFI
Kentucky Jubilee at TCMDB

1951 films
American musical comedy films
Lippert Pictures films
1951 musical comedy films
American black-and-white films
1950s English-language films
1950s American films